Joseba Imanol Idiakez Barkaiztegi (born 14 March 1972) is a Spanish former footballer who played as a midfielder, currently manager of CD Leganés.

Playing career
Born in San Sebastián, Gipuzkoa, Idiakez finished his development with Real Sociedad, making his senior debut with the reserves and also playing alongside his younger brother Iñigo. After leaving Sanse, he joined neighbouring SD Beasain.

Idiakez resumed his career mainly in the Segunda División B, representing Real Avilés, Burgos CF (two stints), Ciudad de Murcia – appearing half a season in the Segunda División– CD Linares, Girona FC and CF Reus Deportiu, retiring in 2007 at the age of 35 due to a serious injury.

Coaching career
Idiakez returned to Real Sociedad B after retiring, being appointed manager in the summer of 2008, relegated from the third division in his first season but winning promotion in the second. In March 2011 he signed with Polideportivo Ejido, being in charge for eight matches and eventually leading the team to safety.

In June 2011, Idiakez joined fellow division three side CD Guijuelo, moving the following campaign to Real Unión and CD Toledo on 3 July 2013, always in the third tier. After taking Lleida Esportiu to the promotion play-offs in the same level in 2016 he moved abroad for the first time in his entire career, signing for two years at AEK Larnaca FC in the Cypriot First Division.

Back to Spain, Idiakez was appointed manager of second division club Real Zaragoza on 18 June 2018, but was sacked on 21 October. Shortly after, he replaced compatriot Andoni Iraola at the helm of former side AEK.

Idiakez joined Villarreal CF's staff under Unai Emery in July 2020. He returned to head coaching duties on 6 June 2022, taking over from Mehdi Nafti at second-tier CD Leganés.

Managerial statistics

Honours

Manager
AEK Larnaca
Cypriot Cup: 2017–18

References

External links

1972 births
Living people
Spanish footballers
Footballers from San Sebastián
Association football midfielders
Segunda División players
Segunda División B players
Tercera División players
Real Sociedad B footballers
SD Beasain footballers
Real Avilés CF footballers
Burgos CF footballers
Ciudad de Murcia footballers
CD Linares players
Girona FC players
CF Reus Deportiu players
Spanish football managers
Segunda División managers
Segunda División B managers
Tercera División managers
Real Sociedad B managers
Polideportivo Ejido managers
CD Guijuelo managers
Real Unión managers
CD Toledo managers
Lleida Esportiu managers
Real Zaragoza managers
CD Leganés managers
Cypriot First Division managers
AEK Larnaca FC managers
Spanish expatriate football managers
Expatriate football managers in Cyprus
Spanish expatriate sportspeople in Cyprus
Villarreal CF non-playing staff